A Dalén light is a light produced from burning of carbide gas (acetylene), combined with a solar sensor which automatically operates the light only during darkness.

Overview
The technology was the predominant form of light source in lighthouses from the 1900s through the 1960s, when electric lighting had become dominant. The system was invented by Gustaf Dalén and marketed by his company AGA. Dalén later invented the AGA cooker in 1922. The Dalén light is notable because of its  sun valve (a.k.a. solar valve), which earned its inventor the Nobel prize in physics. The Carbide lamp was developed in the early 1900s. While the lamps proved useful in many applications, the problem of safely storing acetylene meant they needed regular refilling which constrained their use in applications such as lighthouses.

Examples
Lighthouses using Dalén lighting have included:
Barrenjoey Lighthouse, New South Wales (1932–1972)
Peninsula Point Light (1922–1936) Upper Peninsula Michigan United States
Point Stephens Light, New South Wales  (1922–1960)
Celarain Lighthouse, Mexico (1934 –    )
Skerryvore Lighthouse, the Hebrides  (    –1959)
Recalada a Bahía Blanca Light, Argentina (1928–1974)

References

External links
Terry Pepper, Seeing the Light – Lighthouses of the Western Great Lakes, Illumination.
 

Lighthouse fixtures
Types of lamp
Synthetic fuel technologies
Linde plc
Swedish inventions